Lego World Racers was a Lego theme that centred around two racing teams competing to win the world cup. The first six sets were released in May and June 2010, with an additional three sets being released later in 2010. The theme was discontinued in the same year.

Story
Lego World Racers was based on a storyline that focused on two racing teams named the Backyard Blasters and the X-Treme Daredevils that compete in races across the world to win the world cup. The Lego minifigures in the X-treme Daredevils' team were Dex-treme, Rex-treme, and Max-treme. The minifigures in the Backyard Blasters' team were Bubba, Bart, and Billy Bob Blaster.

Construction sets
The first World Racers sets were released during the end of May and the start of June, 2010. Blizzard's Peak was a 504 piece set with an age rating of 8–14 and was marked as Race 5 in the theme. The set features included two artic racers, a helicopter, snowmobile, and six minifigures. The minifigures included three members of the Backyard Blaster team – Bart Blaster, Billy Bob Blaster, Bubba Blaster, two members of the X-Treme Daredevils team – Max-treme and Dex-treme, and one race official. Desert of Destruction was a 961 piece set with an age rating of 8–14 and was marked as Race 6 in the theme. The set features included the X-treme Daredevils team truck that was around 53 cm (21"), a desert rally racer, a desert buggy racer, and eight minifigures. The minifigures included five members of the X-treme Daredevils – Rex-treme, Dex-treme, Max-treme and two crewmembers, two members of the Backyard Blasters – Bart Blaster and Bubba Blaster, and a race official. Snake Canyon was a 57 piece set with an age rating of 7–14 and was marked as Race 1. The set features included two off-road motorcycles, a winners platform and two minifigures - Rex-treme and Bart Blaster.

Jagged Jaws Reef was a 191 piece set with an age rating of 7–14 and was marked as Race 2. The set featured two 15 cm (6") long race boats, a shark and two minifigures - Rex-treme and Bart Blaster Wreckage Road was a 292 piece set with an age rating of 7–14 and was marked as Race 3. The set featured two 15 cm (6") long race cars, a start/finish gateway, and four minifigures. The minifigures included two members of the X-treme Daredevils - Max-treme and Rex-treme, and two members of the Backyard Blasters - Bart Blaster and Billy Bob Blaster. Gator Swamp was a 354 piece set with an age rating of 7–14 and was marked as Race 4. The features included two 15 cm (6") long hovercraft racers, a gator, a dock and minifigures. The minifigures included two members of the Backyard Blasters - Billy Bob Blaster and Bubba Blaster, two members of the X-treme Daredevils - Rex-treme and Dex-treme, and a race official.

Later in 2010 three promotional sets were released. World Race Powerboat was a 27 piece set marked as Race 9. It featured a small powerboat and the minifigure Rex-treme. World Race Buggy was a 35 piece set marked as Race 8. It featured a small buggy and the minifigure Bart Blaster. Rocket Kit was a 26 piece set marked as Race 6. It featured four dynamite pieces and eight brick-built rockets.

See also 
 Lego City
 Lego Fusion
 Lego Speed Champions
 Lego Speed Racer
 Lego Racers
 Lego Cars

References

World Racers
Products introduced in 2010
Products and services discontinued in 2010